Franklin Hills is a neighborhood in Los Angeles, California. It is home to one Los Angeles Historic-Cultural Monument.

History
Franklin Hills is a residential neighborhood, set in the hills east of Los Feliz Village. The Los Angeles Times described it as a "diverse community" with a "collage of architectural styles".

Franklin Hills is home to the Shakespeare Bridge. The ravine over which the bridge crosses was once a perennial stream called Arroyo de la Sacatela. To the east of the bridge is the Franklin Hills public stairway system, which provides pedestrian linkages among the curvy streets, a series of 14 staircases originally built in the 1920s to provide hillside homeowners pedestrian access to the trolley lines below.

Prospect Studios is on Talmadge Street. Opened in 1915 as the Vitagraph Studio, the lot later became the Warner Brothers Studios East Hollywood Annex, then home of the ABC Television Center and local affiliate KABC, finally becoming part of the Disney Corporation in 1996.

Brothers Roy and Walt Disney both owned homes at the corner of Lyric Avenue and St. George Street  during the late 1920s so that they could walk to their new animation studio, located a few blocks away at 2719 Hyperion Avenue  (at the intersection of Hyperion and Griffith Park Boulevard).

Geography

Franklin Hills is bounded on the north by Franklin Avenue and St. George Street, on the west by Talmadege Street, on the south by Fountain Avenue, and on the east by Tracy Street and Hyperion Avenue.

Franklin Hills is bordered by Los Feliz Village on the west, Silver Lake on the east, and East Hollywood on the south.

Landmarks and attractions
 Shakespeare Bridge - Los Angeles Historic-Cultural Monument #126
 Prospect Studios - 4151 Prospect Avenue

Government
Franklin Hills is within the Los Feliz Neighborhood Council. Section E comprises Franklin Hills and a few neighboring blocks on the west.

Education
There is one public school within the Franklin Hills boundaries:
 Thomas Starr King Middle School - 4201 Fountain Avenue

Parks and recreation
 Franklin Hills Community Garden

Notable residents
Kalman Bloch, clarinetist  
 Roy O. Disney
 Walt Disney
Kim Gordon, musician
Joseph Gordon-Levitt, actor 
Zoe Saldana, actor 
Joey Waronker, drummer 
Kristen Wiig, actor 
Michele Zukovsky, clarinetist

References

External links
 Franklin Hills Area Map
 Franklin Hills Public Stairway Map

Neighborhoods in Los Angeles
Los Feliz, Los Angeles
Central Los Angeles
Northwest Los Angeles